New Zealand Trade and Enterprise (NZTE) is New Zealand's economic development and trade promotion agency. It offers strategic advice, access to networks and influencers, research and market intelligence, and targeted financial support to help businesses on their international journey, and works to promote and support the growth of New Zealand business overseas.

History
NZTE was established on 1 July 2003.

New Zealand Trade and Enterprise (NZTE) is New Zealand's international business development agency. Their role is to make a difference for New Zealand by helping businesses grow bigger, better, faster in international markets. NZTE's strategy supports the Government's Business Growth Agenda, which creates conditions that encourage successful businesses to grow globally.

NZTE's products and services help businesses to grow and succeed internationally. These include strategic advice, access to networks and influencers, research and market intelligence. NZTE's services are aligned with different stages of a business lifecycle – from starting and growing a business, through to exporting and operating internationally – and help address the scale and distance issues faced by New Zealand exporters. Some services are provided directly by NZTE staff in New Zealand and around the world, while others are provided through external organisations – such as Regional Business Partners and expert advisors – funded by NZTE.

NZTE has ten offices in New Zealand and staff in 50 locations around the world who work in partnership with New Zealand businesses, helping to build strategic alliances and develop commercial relationships, connecting them with opportunities and contacts in international markets, and sharing knowledge, experience and networks to help businesses develop capability and scale.

NZTE's focus is on international opportunities that match New Zealand's current/potential business capability and provide sustained economic benefit, and helping international investors to identify New Zealand-based opportunities and gain access to government and private sector.

NZTE International Offices

Australia-Pacific 
 Brisbane, Australia
 Melbourne, Australia
 Port Moresby, Papua New Guinea
 Sydney (Regional Office), Australia

East Asia 
 Bangkok, Thailand
 Beijing, China
 Chengdu, China
 Guangzhou, China
 Ho Chi Minh, Vietnam
 Hong Kong, China
 Jakarta, Indonesia
 Kuala Lumpur, Malaysia
 Manila, Philippines
 New Zealand Central office, Shanghai, China
 Seoul, Korea
 Shanghai, China
 Shenzhen, China
 Singapore, Singapore
 Taipei, Taiwan
 Tokyo, Japan

India, Middle East & Africa 
 Abu Dhabi, United Arab Emirates
 Dubai, United Arab Emirates
 Mumbai, India
 New Delhi, India
 Riyadh, Saudi Arabia

Europe 
 Istanbul, Turkey
 Hamburg, Germany
 London, United Kingdom
 Madrid, Spain
 Milan, Italy
 Moscow, Russia
 Paris, France
 Amsterdam, Netherlands

North America 
 Los Angeles (regional office), United States of America
 Mexico City, Mexico
 New York, United States of America
 San Francisco, United States of America
 Vancouver, Canada
 Washington, United States of America

South America 
 Bogota, Colombia 
 Santiago, Chile
 São Paulo, Brazil

Antarctica 
 Scott Base

Programmes and Services

NZTE offer many services designed to grow New Zealand businesses. These include but are not limited to:

 Global Market Research Team (GMRT)
 Beachheads
 Better by design
 Creative HQ
 KEA - World Class New Zealanders
 New Zealand International Business Awards

References

New Zealand Crown agents
Foreign trade of New Zealand